Diógenes Capemba João (born 1 January 1997) is an Angolan professional footballer who plays as a midfielder for Atlético Petróleos de Luanda.

References

External links
Soccerway Profile
ZeroZero Profile

1997 births
Living people
Angolan footballers
Angola international footballers
Atlético Petróleos de Luanda players
Association football midfielders